Viscount of Dunbar was a title in the Peerage of Scotland created on 14 November 1620, along with the title Lord Constable, for Sir Henry Constable. The titles have been dormant since the death of the 4th Viscount in 1718.

Viscounts of Dunbar (1620)
Henry Constable, 1st Viscount of Dunbar ( – 1645)
John Constable, 2nd Viscount of Dunbar (1615 – )
Robert Constable, 3rd Viscount of Dunbar (1651–1714)
William Constable, 4th Viscount of Dunbar (1654–1718)

See also
Earl of Dunbar

References

Dormant viscountcies in the peerage of Scotland
1620 establishments in Scotland
Noble titles created in 1620